The Slimnic is a right tributary of the river Vișa in Romania. It flows into the Vișa in Mândra. Its largest tributary is the Șarba, from the left.

References

Rivers of Romania
Rivers of Sibiu County